Since the Olympic Games began in Athens in 1896, wrestling (in the form of Greco-Roman wrestling) became a focus of the Games, with the exception of the 1900 Summer Olympics when wrestling did not appear on the program. Freestyle wrestling and weight classes both made their first appearance in 1904. The women's competition was introduced in 2004.

In 2013, the IOC voted to drop wrestling from the Summer Olympic programme. The president of the sport's governing body, FILA (now United World Wrestling), resigned after a subsequent motion of no confidence, and several of the FILA leadership followed suit. Following these and revisions to the programme for 2016 (including rule changes and additional women's competitions), wrestling successfully campaigned to be readmitted to the Summer Olympic programme.

Summary
Summary of overall best wrestling nation at each Olympics, which includes combining all styles that were contested. Greco-Roman has been contested since the 1896 Summer Olympics, with men's freestyle being contested since 1904 and women's freestyle since 2004.

Removal and reinstatement 
In an effort to control the size and costs of the Summer Olympics, and make the Games "relevant to sports fans of all generations", the IOC evaluated the Olympic event programme in place for the 2016 Summer Olympics, and voted on 25 "core" sports that would comprise the programme of the 2020 Summer Olympics (which was postponed to 2021 due to the COVID-19 pandemic). One vacancy was to be left open for a new sport. In February 2013, IOC members voted to remove wrestling from the Olympic programme; The New York Times cited several potential factors in the decision, including the lack of universally-known talent unlike other sports, and concern for the lack of women's competitions in wrestling (having only introduced women's freestyle competitions in 2004). FILA (now United World Wrestling), the governing body of Olympic wrestling, immediately criticized the decision. The organization cited wrestling's long-standing history as an Olympic event, which dates as far back as the ancient Olympic Games.

The decision resulted in immediate backlash; Armen Nazaryan and Sagid Murtazaliev both returned gold medals to the IOC in protest, while Nazaryan also staged a hunger strike until the 2013 European Wrestling Championships. FILA president Raphaël Martinetti resigned after a vote of non-confidence by the organization's staff.

Martinetti was replaced as acting president by Nenad Lalović. Under his leadership, the organization began to make changes to its Olympic programme for 2016, including rule changes designed to make bouts faster and encourage more aggression, as well as additional women's weight classes. These changes were intended to help improve audience interest, and address the shortcomings that likely led to the removal of the sport; wrestling joined baseball/softball, as well as squash, on a final shortlist of three sports to be included in the core Olympic programme for 2020. On 8 September 2013, at the 125th IOC Session, the IOC selected wrestling to be reinstated in the Olympic program for 2020 and 2024. Lalović was largely credited for his role in the reinstatement; he remarked that "normally this is done in a few years, we did it in a few months. It was a question of our survival."

Events

Men

Women

Participating nations
The following nations have taken part in the wrestling competition. The numbers in the table indicate the number of competitors sent to that year's Olympics (X means qualified wrestlers for the next Olympics).

All-time medal tables – 1896–2020

All-time medal table combined – Greco-Roman, Freestyle men's and women's – 1896–2020
Sources:

All-time medal table – Greco-Roman – 1896–2020
Sources:

All-time medal table – Freestyle men's, women's – 1904–2020
Sources:

See also

List of Olympic medalists in Freestyle wrestling
List of Olympic medalists in Greco-Roman wrestling
List of Olympic venues in wrestling
Politics and sports

References

 
Sports at the Summer Olympics
Olympics